The Internecine Project is a 1974 British espionage thriller film written by Mort W. Elkind, Barry Levinson, and Jonathan Lynn, directed by Ken Hughes and starring James Coburn and Lee Grant.

Plot
Renowned American economist Robert Elliot (James Coburn) who is about to be promoted to be a government advisor has also been secretly running a business espionage ring in London with the help of 4 operatives- corrupt Foreign Office official Alex Hellman (Ian Hendry), masseur Bert Parsons (Harry Andrews), prostitute Christina Larsson (Christiane Kruger) and scientist David Baker (Michael Jayston). He is advised to have his operatives killed by E.J. Farnsworth (Keenan Wynn), a businessman who has helped secure Elliot's appointment to prevent them from exposing Elliot's dubious activities.  To avoid himself or anyone on the outside being implicated,  Elliot devises and carries out a clever plan in which his four former associates will unwittingly kill each other on the same night. He visits each of his associates in turn and convinces each of them that their intended target is about to expose their activities and that they must be killed to ensure their silence. 

On the night the murders have been planned for, Elliot keeps track of his operatives' progress by listening for a series of telephone rings that indicate each associate's current location.  David leaves for Alex's apartment where he replaces the diabetic Alex's regular insulin supply with a stronger, lethal dose. Despite being delayed in leaving Alex's apartment, he returns home in time to be killed by his own sonic weapon which he had earlier demonstrated to Elliot and which has been planted by Christine on a timer. Christine returns home and Bert enters her apartment with a key given to him by Elliot, and proceeds to strangle Christine to death while she's taking a shower, before placing a fragment of skin Elliot had earlier removed from a corpse under the lifeless Christine's fingernails in order to confuse police pathologists. Alex retrieves a number of items from a locker at London Marylebone station, including a hammer and waits outside the massage parlour Bert works at for his target to arrive. Alex calls Elliot and tells him he can't go through with killing Bert, but Elliot threatens him and Alex reluctantly agrees to continue his mission. He lies in wait for Bert in a back passage and strikes Bert dead with the hammer. A panicked Alex returns home without ringing Elliot to communicate that he's killed Bert and Elliot eventually travels to meet Alex at his home. After confirming to Elliot that he has killed Bert, Alex dies in front of Elliot from the lethal insulin dose planted by David that he has taken.

The next day, before leaving, Elliot receives a package by special delivery. While he is being driven to the airport, he opens the package, which contains a notebook with a message written by David. It states that David never really trusted Elliot and in the event of his death would assume that Elliot was responsible, before revealing that the pages of the notebook are saturated in a deadly poison that is ingested through the skin, which will kill Elliot within 5 minutes. Elliot arrives at the airport dead.

Cast
 James Coburn as Robert Elliot
 Lee Grant as Jean Robertson
 Harry Andrews as Albert Parsons
 Ian Hendry as Alex Hellman
 Michael Jayston as David Baker
 Christiane Krüger as Christina Larsson
 Keenan Wynn as E.J. Farnsworth
 Terence Alexander as Business tycoon
 Philip Anthony as Eliott's secretary
 Julian Glover as Arnold Pryce-Jones
 Mary Larkin as Jean's secretary

Production
The film was made by British Lion, then run by Michael Deeley. Deeley wrote in his memoirs that it and another movie, Who? were financed the same way: half the costs coming from a US deal with Allied Artists, the other half coming from a German tax shelter deal. "In terms of cinema history, neither film is important," wrote Deeley, but he took pride in how they were financed saying "such clever means were the only way to keep British Lion alive."

In her memoirs, Lee Grant called it "a really flimsy film" where "the script was no more than a sixteen page outline, but the money was good and my co star was James Coburn, an actor I admired and wanted to play with."

During filming Grant admitted the film "is a switch for me." She said she did it because she and her husband were about to adopt two children and also because "I thought the picture would be a really great party - a come-as-you-are party because I don't have to put fake wrinkles on as I normally do. My only regret is that I'm breaking my image playing a sexy lady."

Reception
The Los Angeles Times called it "sardonic and interesting".

Filmink argued the movie needed extra twists.

TV Guide says- "Although it has a nice thriller plot line, THE Internecine Project, like the plan, is less than perfect in execution".

References

External links
 
 
 

1974 films
1974 independent films
1970s thriller films
British independent films
British thriller films
British Lion Films films
Films based on American novels
Films based on thriller novels
Films directed by Ken Hughes
Films with screenplays by Jonathan Lynn
Films scored by Roy Budd
1970s English-language films
1970s British films